Dušan Furlan (24 August 1929 – 9 June 2007) was a Slovenian gymnast. He competed in eight events at the 1952 Summer Olympics.

References

1929 births
2007 deaths
Slovenian male artistic gymnasts
Olympic gymnasts of Yugoslavia
Gymnasts at the 1952 Summer Olympics